The red-headed bullfinch (Pyrrhula erythrocephala) is a species of finch in the family Fringillidae, found all across the Himalayas and adjacent highlands. It is found in Bhutan, northern India, Nepal and adjacent southern Tibet. Its natural habitat is temperate forests.

Taxonomy
The taxonomy was described in 2001 by Arnaiz-Villena et al. All birds belonging to the genus Pyrrhula have a common ancestor: Pinicola enucleator.

References

red-headed bullfinch
Birds of Bhutan
Birds of North India
Birds of Nepal
red-headed bullfinch
Taxonomy articles created by Polbot